The Immigration & Passport Police Office is a subdivision of Law Enforcement Command of Islamic Republic of Iran with the authority to issue Iranian passports and deals with Immigrants to Iran. The agency is a member of ICAO's Public Key Directory (PKD).

References 

Law Enforcement Command of Islamic Republic of Iran
Immigration services
Passport offices